In enzymology, a 2-furoyl-CoA dehydrogenase is an enzyme that catalyzes the chemical reaction

2-furoyl-CoA + H2O + acceptor  S-(5-hydroxy-2-furoyl)-CoA + reduced acceptor

The 3 substrates of this enzyme are 2-furoyl-CoA, H2O, and acceptor, whereas its two products are S-(5-hydroxy-2-furoyl)-CoA and reduced acceptor.

This enzyme belongs to the family of oxidoreductases, specifically those acting on the CH-CH group of donor with other acceptors.  The systematic name of this enzyme class is 2-furoyl-CoA:acceptor 5-oxidoreductase (hydroxylating). Other names in common use include furoyl-CoA hydroxylase, 2-furoyl coenzyme A hydroxylase, 2-furoyl coenzyme A dehydrogenase, and 2-furoyl-CoA:(acceptor) 5-oxidoreductase (hydroxylating).  It employs one cofactor, copper.

References

 

EC 1.3.99
Copper enzymes
Enzymes of unknown structure